Against All Authority (often abbreviated AAA) is an American punk rock band known for their political leanings and, previously, as a ska punk band. Their business practice follows a stringent DIY ethic.

History
Against All Authority was founded in Cutler Ridge, Florida in 1992,  driven by willingness to promote their message—"questioning our economic differences and promoting our human similarities". A strong engagement in political and social issues is clearly evident in their lyrics. The band maintain a fierce DIY stance influenced by the approach of the Dead Kennedys and Subhumans. Early in their career the band decided to book concerts, make recordings and even produce band T-shirts on their own. Their first release was a 7" called "Above the Law" in 1994. Later they signed to independent label Hopeless Records, becoming one of their major bands. In addition to touring and recording, the band is frequently involved in demonstrations and social projects. They have also influenced a number of other bands.

Members
 Danny Lore – bass guitar & vocals
 Joe Koontz – guitar & vocals
 Fin "LP" Leavell – bass trombone & baritone saxophone
 Marshall Wildey - trumpet
 Chris “Spikey” Goldbach – drums

Discography

Albums/EPs
 -AAA- Tape (1993)
 Above the Law EP (1994)
 Destroy What Destroys You (1996)
 All Fall Down (1998, Hopeless Records)
 24 Hour Roadside Resistance (2000, Hopeless Records)
 Nothing New for Trash Like You (2001, Sub City Records)
 The Restoration of Chaos & Order (2006, Hopeless Records)

Split EPs
 Against All Authority / Less Than Jake (1995)
 Against All Authority / The Pist (1996, Records of Rebellion)
 Against All Authority / The Crumbs / Pink Lincolns / Gotohells (1996)
 Against All Authority / Anti-Flag - Reject EP (1996, Records of Rebellion)
 Against All Authority / The Criminals – Exchange EP (1999, Sub City Records)
 Against All Authority / Common Rider (2005, Hopeless Records)

Live recordings
 V.M.L Live Presents Against All Authority Live 7/16/95 (1996)
 Live On the Ska Parade Radio Show (1998)

Unofficial bootlegs
 V.M.L Live Presents Against All Authority / The Queers / The Smears / The Meatmen (1999)
 Against All Authority Live At the Fireside Bowl (1999)

References

External links
 Official Website
 

Punk rock groups from Florida
Third-wave ska groups
Musical groups from Miami
Anarcho-punk groups
Musical groups established in 1992
Musical quartets
American ska punk musical groups
Hopeless Records artists
Sub City Records artists